The Red Dog Saloon is a bar and live music venue located in the isolated, old-time mining town of Virginia City, Nevada which played an important role in the history of the psychedelic music scene.

Folk music enthusiast Mark Unobsky bought the old Henry Comstock house in Virginia City and decided to open a folk club together with Chandler A. Laughlin III (1937-2012), a one-time folk club owner, and Don Works in the early 1960s.

In April 1963, Chandler established a kind of family identity among approximately fifty people who attended the traditional, all-night Native American peyote ceremony. This ceremony combined a psychedelic experience with traditional Native American spiritual values; these people went on to sponsor a new genre of musical expression at the venue.

During the summer of 1965, Laughlin (better known in media as Travus T. Hipp, a disc jockey and news commentator,) recruited much of the original talent that led to a mix of traditional folk music and psychedelic rock. He and his friends created what became known as "The Red Dog Experience," featuring previously unknown musical acts — Big Brother and the Holding Company, The Charlatans, The Wildflower and others — who played in the refurbished saloon during 1965 - 66.  There was no clear delineation between "performers" and "audience" in "The Red Dog Experience," during which music, psychedelic experimentation and Bill Ham's first primitive light shows combined to create a new sense of community. Laughlin and George Hunter of the Charlatans were termed "proto-hippies", with their long hair, boots and clothing inspired by the aesthetic of Indigenous peoples.

The poster for the first six-week stint of performances from The Charlatans beginning in June 1965 is a rare psychedelic poster. It is known as "The Seed".

LSD manufacturer Owsley Stanley lived in Berkeley during 1965 and provided much of the LSD that became a part of the "Red Dog Experience".  At the saloon, The Charlatans were the first psychedelic rock band to play live on LSD.

Today the venue features Open Mic on Wednesday evenings and live performances on the weekends.

Notes

External links
 Official website

Drinking establishments in Nevada
Buildings and structures in Virginia City, Nevada
Hippie movement
Music festivals in Nevada
Counterculture festivals
History of subcultures
1960s in Nevada
1970s in Nevada
1960s in the United States
1970s in the United States